These were the squads for the 2007 FIFA Club World Cup, held in Japan from 7 December to 16 December 2007.

Boca Juniors
Head coach:  Miguel Ángel Russo

Milan
Head coach:  Carlo Ancelotti

Étoile du Sahel
Head coach:  Bertrand Marchand

Pachuca
Head coach:  Enrique Meza

Urawa Red Diamonds
Head coach:  Holger Osieck

Sepahan
Head coach:  Luka Bonačić

Waitakere United
Head coach:  Chris Milicich

External links
 List of players
 Provisional lists of players
 Boca Juniors
 Milan
 Étoile du Sahel
 Pachuca
 Urawa Red Diamonds
 Sepahan
 Waitakere United

Squads
FIFA Club World Cup squads